HMS Niger was a  of the Royal Navy. She was launched in 1936 and was sunk during the Second World War. On 5 July 1942, the vessel sailed into a minefield while escorting Convoy QP 13 and struck one of the mines, later sinking with only eight survivors.

Service history
In fog on 5 July 1942 Niger mistook an iceberg for Iceland's North Western Cape and led six merchant ships of Murmansk to Reykjavík convoy QP 13 into Northern Barrage minefield SN72 laid one month earlier at the entrance to the Denmark Strait. Every ship detonated British mines. There were no crewmen lost aboard the Soviet freighter Rodina (4,441 GRT), the Panamanian-flagged freighter Exterminator (6,115 GRT), or the American freighter Hybert (6,120 GRT); but 46 civilian crew and 9 Naval Armed Guards died aboard the American Liberty ship John Randolph (7,191 GRT) and freighters Hefron (7,611 GRT) and Massmar (5,825 GRT); and there were only eight survivors of the 127 men aboard Niger. Only Exterminator could be salvaged. The value of the Northern Barrage was questioned following the accident.

References

External links
 UBoat.net HMS Niger page
 Halcyon-Class.co.uk HMS Niger page

 

Halcyon-class minesweepers
Ships built on the Isle of Wight
1936 ships
World War II minesweepers of the United Kingdom
World War II shipwrecks in the Atlantic Ocean
Maritime incidents in July 1942
Ships sunk by mines